Janos Prohaska (October 10, 1919, Budapest, Hungary – March 13, 1974, Inyo County, California, United States) was a U.S.-based Hungarian actor and stunt performer on American television from the 1960s. He usually played the roles of animals or monsters.

He is best remembered for his recurring comic role as The Cookie Bear on The Andy Williams Show from 1969 to 1971. Prohaska also appeared in multiple roles on such TV series as The Outer Limits, Bewitched, I Dream of Jeannie, Lost in Space, and a few episodes of Gilligan's Island, where he plays a gorilla. His only credited role on that series appears in the episode "Our Vines Have Tender Apes."  In 1967 he appeared as a white gorilla in the "Fatal Cargo" episode of the ABC-TV sci-fi  series Voyage to the Bottom of the Sea.  On NBC-TV's   Star Trek his turns in alien costumes of his own making as the Horta in Star Trek'''s "The Devil in the Dark", and the Mugato in "A Private Little War" are the best known of these. He made an appearance on an episode of What's My Line? in 1969, where he wore one of his ape costumes. 

Personal life and death
He was married to Irene M. Knoke from June 29, 1969 until his death on March 13, 1974. He and his son Robert were killed along with 34 others on March 13, 1974 at 8:28 p.m. in the crash of a chartered Sierra Airlines Convair CV-440 aircraft near Bishop, California, while filming the ABC/Wolper Productions television series Primal Man''. The plane flew into a mountain ridge in darkness, but the exact cause of the crash was never determined. His ashes were interred in the Mausoleum at Woodlawn Memorial Cemetery, Santa Monica.

During the late 1980s revamp of the DC Comics character Blackhawk by Howard Chaykin, the leader of the eponymous group of World War II fighters was revealed to be named Janos Prohaska, in tribute to the actor.

Filmography

References

External links 

 
 
 

1919 births
1974 deaths
Hungarian emigrants to the United States
Hungarian male television actors
Male actors from Budapest
Accidental deaths in California
Victims of aviation accidents or incidents in 1974
Victims of aviation accidents or incidents in the United States
Burials at Woodlawn Memorial Cemetery, Santa Monica
20th-century Hungarian male actors
American stunt performers